Pierre Delalande may refer to:

 Pierre Delalande (engineer), French military engineer 
 Pierre Antoine Delalande (1787–1823), French naturalist and explorer